Bernard's dwarf gecko (Lygodactylus bernardi), also commonly known as FitzSimons' dwarf gecko,  is a species of gecko, a lizard in the family Gekkonidae. The species is endemic to Zimbabwe.

Etymology
The specific name, bernardi, is in honor of British archaeologist Bernard Evelyn Buller Fagg.

Geographic range
L. bernardi is endemic to eastern Zimbabwe. Lygodactylus bonsi from Malawi was originally described as a subspecies of L. bernardi.

Description
Dorsally, L. bernardi is olive with pale spots. Ventrally, it is bluish-white on the throat, yellow on the belly, and orange to orange-brown on the tail.

Adults are only  in snout-to-vent length (SVL).

Reproduction
L. bernardi is an oviparous species.

References

Further reading
Branch, Bill (2004). Field Guide to Snakes and other Reptiles of Southern Africa. Third Revised edition, Second impression. Sanibel Island, Florida: Ralph Curtis Books. 399 pp. . (Lygodactylus bernardi, p. 246 + Plate 90).
FitzSimons V (1958). "On a small collection of reptiles and amphibians from the Inyanga District, S. Rhodesia". Occasional Papers of the National Museum of Southern Rhodesia 3: 204–214. (Lygodactylus bernardi, new species).
Pasteur G (1962). "Notes préliminaires sur les lygodactyles (gekkonidés). II. Diagnose de quelques Lygodactylus d'Afrique". Bulletin de l'Institut fondamental d'Afrique noire 24: 606–614. (Lygodactylus bernardi bonsi, new subspecies). (in French).

Lygodactylus
Geckos of Africa
Reptiles of Zimbabwe
Endemic fauna of Zimbabwe
Taxa named by Vivian Frederick Maynard FitzSimons
Reptiles described in 1958
Fauna of the Eastern Highlands